Robert or Bob Sykes may refer to:

 Bob Sykes (American football) (born 1927), former American football fullback
 Bob Sykes (baseball) (born 1954), retired Major League Baseball pitcher
 Bob Sykes (ice hockey) (born 1951), ice hockey player
Robert "Pliers" Sykes, Wing Commander character
Prof. Robert Sykes, see Snowburst

See also
Bob Sikes (1906–1994), American politician
Bob Sikes Airport